Urša Bogataj (born 7 March 1995) is a Slovenian ski jumper. She is the 2022 Olympic champion in the women's normal hill individual event.

She made her World Cup debut on 3 December 2011 in Lillehammer, Norway.

Major tournament results

Winter Olympics

FIS Nordic World Ski Championships

World Cup

Standings

Individual wins

References

External links

1995 births
Living people
Skiers from Ljubljana
Slovenian female ski jumpers
FIS Nordic World Ski Championships medalists in ski jumping
Ski jumpers at the 2012 Winter Youth Olympics
Ski jumpers at the 2018 Winter Olympics
Ski jumpers at the 2022 Winter Olympics
Medalists at the 2022 Winter Olympics
Olympic ski jumpers of Slovenia
Olympic gold medalists for Slovenia
Olympic medalists in ski jumping
21st-century Slovenian women